Hardbat table tennis is the classical table tennis playing style that existed prior to the advent of sponge rubber in the 1950s. The main difference between hardbat and modern table tennis lies in the racket used, which greatly affects the dynamics and strategy of the game. Hardbat rackets use short outward "pips" with no sponge, resulting in decreased speeds and reduced spin compared to rackets using sponge rubber. This results in slower shots, and a more strategic game rather than the fast-paced, heavy topspin attacking style that dominates regular table tennis. Although the older term 'ping-pong' is often used as a synonym for table tennis generally, hardbat is sometimes referred to specifically as 'ping-pong' in contradistinction to  modern 'soft-bat' (i.e sponge bat) table tennis.

There has recently been a resurgence of hardbat play, with national championships contested yearly in the United States. A "World Championship of Ping Pong", a table tennis tournament using standardised hardbats, was promoted by Matchroom Sports at Alexandra Palace in January 2013. It was won by Maxim Shmyrev.

The American Marty Reisman became the oldest person ever to win an open national competition in a racquet sport when he won the 1997 United States National Hardbat championship at age 67.

See also
 Table tennis terminology

Notes

External links
 $100,000 Bud Light Hardbat Classic Photos & Video Gallery (link dead)

Table tennis